"Flying High" is the third single from Freeez' debut album Southern Freeez.

"Flying High" performed moderately well in the UK, peaking at #35 on the UK Singles Chart

Track listing

UK single
 "Flying High" - 05:30
 "Flying High (remix)"

Chart

1981

Credits
Bass guitar by Peter Maas 
Drums by Paul Morgan
Electric guitar by Gordon Sullivan
Keyboard by Andy Stennett
Horns arrangement by Andy Stennett
Percussion by John Rocca
Saxophone and flute by Geoff Warren 
Trombone by David Allison 
Trumpet by Lawrie Brown  
Produced by John Rocca
Engineers: Simon Sullivan, Paul Burry

References

See also
Freeez discography
Freeez

1981 singles
Freeez songs
1981 songs
Beggars Banquet Records singles